Mount Henry MacLeod is a  summit located in Jasper National Park, in the Canadian Rockies of Alberta, Canada.

Mount Henry MacLeod was named for Henry A. MacLeod, a Canadian Pacific Railroad surveyor who investigated a potential route in the Maligne Valley in 1875.

Geology

Like other mountains in Banff Park, the mountain is composed of sedimentary rock laid down during the Precambrian to Jurassic periods. Formed in shallow seas, this sedimentary rock was pushed east and over the top of younger rock during the Laramide orogeny.

Climate

Based on the Köppen climate classification, Henry MacLeod is located in a subarctic climate zone with cold, snowy winters, and mild summers. Temperatures can drop below -20 °C with wind chill factors below -30 °C.

References

Three-thousanders of Alberta
Mountains of Jasper National Park
Canadian Rockies